Christ Church is a Grade II listed parish church in the Church of England in the Summerfield district of Birmingham.

History

The foundation stone was laid in November 1883 by the widow of Revd George Lea, vicar of St George's Church, Edgbaston. The church was built between 1883 and 1885 in a Perpendicular Style to designs by the architect J.A. Chatwin. It was consecrated on 30 April 1885.

A parish was created out of the parish of St John's Church, Ladywood. In 1906 part of the parish was transferred to St Augustine's Church, Edgbaston.

Organ

The organ was installed by Nicholson and Co in 1889. A specification of the organ can be found on the National Pipe Organ Register.

The community today 

, Christ Church serves a diverse, urban population of nearly 12,000 people. During a period of fundraising and repair and renewal, the worshipping community gathered in the adjoining hall. After six years, in October 2019, public worship recommenced in the church building. Further online information can be found at www.facebook.com/christchurchsummerfield and at https://www.ccschurch.org.uk

References

External links 

 

Church of England church buildings in Birmingham, West Midlands
Churches completed in 1885
19th-century Church of England church buildings
Grade II listed buildings in Birmingham